Rustia bilsana is a species of plant in the family Rubiaceae. It is endemic to Ecuador.

Sources 

bilsana
Endemic flora of Ecuador
Endangered plants
Taxonomy articles created by Polbot